The Sioux Falls Canaries are a professional baseball team based in Sioux Falls, South Dakota, United States. The Canaries are members of the North Division of the American Association of Professional Baseball, an official Partner League of Major League Baseball. Since the 1993 season, the Canaries have played their home games at Sioux Falls Stadium, commonly known as The Birdcage. From 2010 to 2012, the team was called the Sioux Falls Fighting Pheasants.

History

Early Sioux Falls teams 
Professional baseball in Sioux Falls dates back at least to 1902, when the original Canaries joined the Iowa–South Dakota League. That team and its league lasted just two seasons. Another team, known variously as the Soos as well as the Canaries, was a member of the Dakota League from 1920 to 1923, then moved to the short-lived Tri-State League in 1924.

The longest-lived Canaries prior to the current team were founded in 1933 as part of the Nebraska State League. They joined the Western League in 1939, then joined the original Northern League when the Western League folded after the 1941 season. The Canaries played in the Northern League in 1942 and again from 1946 to 1953. The Sioux Falls Packers played in the collegiate summer Basin League from 1964 to 1965. Baseball Hall of Fame inductee Don Sutton played for the Sioux Falls Packers in 1964.

The city was without a Northern League franchise until 1966. Then, the Sioux Falls Packers began play and spent six seasons in the circuit until the league ceased operations following the 1971 campaign.

Current team 
A handful of independent baseball pioneers revived the Northern League in 1993. Sioux Falls competed in a six-team league, joining the St. Paul Saints, Rochester Aces, Thunder Bay Whiskey Jacks, Sioux City Explorers, and Duluth–Superior Dukes.

On the field, the Canaries enjoyed their greatest successes in 1994 and 1996. Former major leaguer Pedro Guerrero batted .329 with eight home runs and 47 RBIs for the 1994 Canaries, as the team posted a 47–33 record. Sioux Falls was narrowly beat out by Sioux City in the first half of the season while the "Birds" finished four games out of first in the second half. Chris Powell batted a league-best .357, while Jamie Ybarra paced all league hurlers with 10 wins and 109 strikeouts.

In 1996, the Canaries overcame a 20–22 first half to the season and posted a 24–18 mark over the second half of the campaign. Even then, the team finished three games back of the Fargo-Moorhead RedHawks.

New ownership took over the club in 1998 and a steady diet of improvements have followed, including a new manager and new logo.

The Canaries posted a 55–35 record in 2001 and gained the team's first playoff berth since the league re-emerged in 1993. On July 11, 2001, the Canaries won the first-half title in the South Division on the final day of the half. Sioux Falls won 21–7 win over Duluth-Superior in the game that secured its first pennant and its first playoff appearance.

Team owners and city officials hosted a ceremonial groundbreaking in November 1999, kicking off a US$5.6 million renovation to Sioux Falls Stadium. The new Birdcage drew national attention on June 2, 2001, as USA Today writer Mel Antonen wrote a feature story on the retrofit. The project drew praise for the integration of an existing facility with more modern elements. Sioux Falls Stadium now features nine luxury suites, a  home clubhouse, a group barbecue area, and a video wall/scoreboard that features live and recorded video clips as well as animated pieces.

On September 29, 2005, the Canaries left the Northern League, along with the Lincoln Saltdogs, the Sioux City Explorers and the St. Paul Saints to form the American Association for the 2006 season.

Sioux Falls struggled early on in the new league, but everything came together for the Canaries in 2008.  They posted their best regular-season record ever at 60–36, and won the first-half North Division championship with a 31–17 mark.  The Canaries opened the 2008 playoffs by sweeping rival Sioux City in three games, then took on Grand Prairie for the American Association championship.  Sioux Falls took the best-of-five series three games to one, earning the clinching win in dramatic fashion on a walk-off single in the bottom of the 12th inning.

On March 25, 2013, Sioux Falls Sports LLC, the ownership group of the Sioux Falls Pheasants and Sioux Falls Stampede, announced they had changed the name of the franchise from the Sioux Falls Fighting Pheasants back to the original name, "Sioux Falls Canaries."  The club unveiled the team logos for the Canaries, designed by Fresh Produce of Sioux Falls.

On March 12, 2021, Brian Slipka, small business leader, and Anthony Albanese (Twan), co-founder of Duke Cannon Supply Co., purchased the Canaries through True North Sports LLC. 

On May 6, 2021, Sioux Falls Canaries owners Brian Slipka and Anthony Albanese launched the “Canaries Community Fund,” an initiative of the Slipka Foundation, to support charitable organizations and causes in South Dakota.  

The Canaries Community Fund focuses on the Slipka Foundation’s three pillars — education, community engagement, and character-building among youth.

The Canaries award scholarships to children to cover participation fees in extracurriculars, provide baseball tickets to youth, families, and charitable organizations, and are active in the Sioux Falls community.

Roster

Notable alumni

 Dean Deetz (2022)
 Osvaldo Martínez (2022–present)
 Riley Ferrell (2022–present)
 Caleb Frare (2021)
 Mitch Glasser (2018-2019, 2021)
 Tanner Anderson (2020)
 Ryan Brett (2020)
 Tyler Danish (2020)
 Madison Younginer (2020)
 Tyler Herron (2019-2020)
 Taylor Hill (2019)
 Adrián Nieto (2019)
 Jake Esch (2018)
 José Ortega (2016-2017)
 Misael Siverio (2016)
 Ángel Chávez (2015)
 Jason Repko (2015)
 John Brebbia (2014)
 Brandon Jones (2014)
 Reggie Abercrombie (2010–2013)
 Eddy Rodríguez (2010)
 Reggie Taylor (2009)
 Pat Mahomes (2007–2009)
 Orlando Miller (2007)
 Chad Hermansen (2006)
 Edgard Clemente (2005-2006)
 George Sherrill (2001)
 Mike Busch (2000–2001)
 Brian Traxler (1997, 2000)
 Kim Batiste (1998)
 Lee Guetterman (1997)
 Steve Howe (1997) MLB All-Star
 Benny Castillo (1995–1998)
 Pedro Guerrero (1993–1994) 5x MLB All-Star

Retired numbers

References

 aabfan.com – yearly league standings & awards (American Association)
 nlfan.com – yearly league standings & awards (Northern League)

External links

nlfan.com Sioux Falls Canaries Guide (Northern League '93-'05)
aabfan.com Sioux Falls Canaries Guide (American Association '06-)

Sports in Sioux Falls, South Dakota
American Association of Professional Baseball teams
Northern League (baseball, 1993–2010) teams
Professional baseball teams in South Dakota
1993 establishments in South Dakota
Baseball teams established in 1993